MS Bahamas Celebration was a midsize cruise ship formerly operated by Celebration Cruise Line. Between March 2009 and October 2014, she operated two- and three-day cruises from Port Everglades to the Bahamas. In March 2010 she started operating two-day cruises from the Port of Palm Beach.

The ship was built in 1981 by Howaldtswerke-Deutsche Werft (HDW) in Kiel, Germany, as MS Prinsesse Ragnhild for Jahre Line. In 1990 she was transferred to Color Line. In 1992 she was extensively rebuilt at Astilleros Españoles in Cadiz, Spain. She was withdrawn from service with Color Line on 6 May 2008.

Service history

Prinsesse Ragnhild

From 1981 to 2004, MS Prinsesse Ragnhild operated on the Oslo to Kiel route, first for Jahre Line and, from 1990 onwards, for their successor Color Line. In 1992 she was radically rebuilt at Astilleros Españoles, Cadiz, increasing her length by 35.25 meters and passenger capacity by 858.

On 8 July 1999, there was a fire in the engine room, resulting in a complete evacuation of the ship. With the Scandinavian Star disaster fresh in mind, a full emergency was called and all ships in the area came to the rescue. Helicopters and firecrews from Norway, Sweden, and Denmark all participated in the rescue effort, and the evacuation was described by most passengers as "controlled". However, one woman died after the fire as a result of a heart attack. After repairs at Blohm & Voss in Hamburg, Germany, the ship resumed operations on the third of September. On 1 March 2002, the ship suffered another engine room fire, which was quickly extinguished.

In 2003 Color Line spent sixty million Norwegian kroner to upgrade the onboard interior. In 2005 she was transferred to the new Bergen—Stavanger—Hirtshals route, when Color Line introduced the new MS Color Fantasy on the Oslo—Kiel route. On 8 January 2008 Prinsesse Ranghild was moved to the Oslo–Hirtshals route, replacing the MS Color Festival, which was sold to Corsica Ferries. In April 2008, Color Line announced that due to "negative financial development" in the service, the Oslo—Hirtshals route was to be closed on 6 May 2008, and the Prinsesse Ragnhild was placed for sale. Following closure of the route, the Prinsesse Ragnhild was laid up at Sandefjord.

On 3 September 2008, Color Line reported that the Prinsesse Ragnhild had been sold to Celebration Cruise Holdings for twenty-three million euro. The ship was delivered to her new owners on 1 October 2008, renamed Bahamas Celebration, and left Sandefjord on the same date for Grand Bahama Island.

Listing and Scrapping

On 31 October 2014, Bahamas Celebration struck an unknown object while departing from Freeport, opening up a small hole in the port side. The ship was able to return to the port and all passengers and crew were able to disembark and no injuries were reported. As of 3 November 2014, the hole had been patched, but the ship was still listing by about 10 degrees and salvage crews were trying to assess the damage.

On 24 January 2015 it was announced by Bahamas Paradise Cruise Line that the ship has been sold for scrap. The ship arrived at the scrapping yard on 29 October and was gone by the end of 2016.

References
Notes

External links 

Short Video Clip of Bahamas Celebration as Prinsesse Ragnhild approaching Kiel
Website for Celebration Cruise Lines' MS Bahamas Celebration

 http://grandcelebrationlive.com/

Cruiseferries
Passenger ships of Norway
Ships built in Kiel
1980 ships
Former Color Line ships